Marsden is a suburb in the City of Logan, Queensland, Australia.

Geography 
Most of the area has been developed into housing estates.  Marsden once extended further south to include the area now known as Crestmead.

The northern boundary of the suburb roughly runs parallel to the Logan Motorway.

History 
The suburb was named after Violet Marsden, a member of a pioneer family, associated with the Kingston Park and Districts Progress Association.

Marsden State School opened on 23 January 1978.

Marsden State High School opened on 27 January 1987. The school is now within the boundaries of neighbouring Waterford West.

Burrowes State School opened on 27 January 1987.

St Francis' College opened on 8 February 1988. The school is now with the boundaries of neighbouring Crestmead.

The Marsden Library opened in 2006 with a major refurbishment in 2015.

The median age of the Marsden population was 27 years, 10 years below the national median of 37.  65.2% of people living in Marsden were born in Australia. The other top responses for country of birth were New Zealand 10.8%, England 2.7%, Samoa 2.1%, Cambodia 1%, Fiji 1%.  76% of people spoke only English at home; the next most common languages were 4.3% Samoan, 1.8% Khmer, 1% Hindi, 0.6% Romanian, 0.5% Spanish.

Education 
Marsden State School is a government primary (Prep-6) school for boys and girls at Hickory Street. In 2018, the school had an enrolment of 1048 students with 70 teachers (66 full-time equivalent) and 39 non-teaching staff (30 full-time equivalent). It includes a special education program.

Burrowes State School is a government primary (Prep-6) school for boys and girls at Third Avenue. In 2018, the school had an enrolment of 786 students with 61 teachers (57 full-time equivalent) and 32 non-teaching staff (23 full-time equivalent). It includes a special education program.

Amenities 

Marsden is also home to Scrubby Creek, which passes along the northern extent of the suburb.  Along the creek, from near Third Avenue, through to Marsden Park Shopping Centre area is a series of parks, bike paths and walkways.

The Logan City Council operate a public library at 35 Chambers Flat Road.

Notable people
 Israel Folau
 Chris Sandow
 Cameron Smith
 Joe Tomane
 Antonio Winterstein

References

External links